The Hyatt Regency Phoenix is a convention hotel in Downtown Phoenix, Arizona, United States.  It is 317 feet (97 m) tall and has 24 floors. It was completed in 1976. The top floor has a revolving restaurant. It was designed by Charles Luckman and Associates to complement the Phoenix Civic Plaza (now called Phoenix Convention Center) and Phoenix Symphony Hall. The building was constructed by Chanen Construction Company. The hotel's façade is clad in textured split ribbed concrete block.

The hotel lobby and restaurants occupy the main level. The second floor features meeting rooms and an additional restaurant while an atrium rises 8 stories. Floors 9 through 21 house guest rooms. Floors 22 and 23 house mechanical equipment and are called "the neck of the Compass". The Compass Restaurant sits atop the hotel on floor 24. The Compass is Arizona's only revolving restaurant. The elevator bank offers two enclosed guest elevators and three "scenic elevators", which glide upward from the lobby, through the atrium and, finally, on the building's exterior, offering views of downtown Phoenix and of Phoenix Sky Harbor International Airport.

The hotel has 693 guest rooms, two restaurants, a grab n' go market, a swimming pool, of meeting space, and a retail shop.

The Hyatt Regency Phoenix was chosen by the NFL as the headquarters hotel for Super Bowl XLII which was played in nearby Glendale in February 2008.

On July 1, 2008, the Hyatt Regency Phoenix was sold for $96 million to Los Angeles-based DiNapoli Capital Partners.

References

External links
 Official website

Skyscraper hotels in Phoenix, Arizona
Hyatt Hotels and Resorts
Buildings and structures with revolving restaurants
Hotel buildings completed in 1976
Hotels established in 1976
1976 establishments in Arizona
Charles Luckman buildings